Galileo Chini (2 December 1873 - 23 August 1956) was an Italian decorator, designer, painter, and potter.

Biography 
A prominent member of the Italian Liberty style movement, or Italian Art Nouveau,  he taught decorative
arts at the Accademia di Belle Arti in Florence. He was responsible for several of the paintings and decorations in the Brandini Chapel at Castelfiorentino, the church of San Francesco de' Ferri in Pisa, and the Ananta Samakhom Throne Hall in Bangkok. His theatrical work included designing the sets for the European premiere of Puccini's opera Gianni Schicchi (Rome, January 1919) and the world premiere of his Turandot (Milan, 1926). He also created the sets for the premieres of Umberto Giordano's opera La cena delle beffe (Milan, 1924) and Sem Benelli's play of the same name on which the opera was based (Rome, 1909).

Influenced by Gustav Klimt, Chini and Vittorio Zecchin (1878 – 1947) created a number of panels in 1914 for the Venice Hotel Terminus called "La Primavera" and "Mille e una notte". These were later exhibited in the Boncompagni Ludovisi Decorative Art Museum.

Gallery

Sources
Capri, Antonio (1971). Storia della musica: Dalle antiche civiltà orientali alla musica elettronica , Casa Editrice Dr. Francesco Vallardi.
Pedagotti, Simona (2005). "Galileo Chini and the Brandini Chapel" in Francesca Allegri and Massimo Tosi (eds.), Castelfiorentino: Terra d'arte: centro viario e spirituale sulla Francigena, pp. 185–189. Federighi. 
Peleggi, Maurizio (2002). Lords of Things: The Fashioning of the Siamese Monarchy's Modern Image. University of Hawaii Press.

References 

1873 births
1956 deaths
Artists from Florence
Art Nouveau designers
Art Nouveau painters
19th-century Italian painters
Italian male painters
20th-century Italian painters
Italian potters
Italian set decorators
Italian interior designers
19th-century Italian male artists
20th-century Italian male artists